MasterChef India is an Indian competitive cooking game show franchise based on the Australian show MasterChef Australia, which itself is based on the original British MasterChef. MasterChef India Season 1-4 and Junior Masterchef Swaad Ke Ustaad was produced by Colosceum Media. Endemol Shine India has been producing MasterChef India Season 5 onwards through Star India and Sun TV Network with Innovative Film Academy co-producing it for South Indian regional versions. It was originally started in Hindi language and has been extended to three languages spoken in the Indian sub-continent, including Tamil and Telugu. The Hindi version is available on Disney+ Hotstar while Tamil and Telugu are available on Sun NXT.

Overview 
There are three versions in production. It was first made in Hindi-language in 2010. In 2010, Star India got the rights for producing MasterChef India in Hindi.  In early-2021, Endemol Shine India decided to expand the show in other Indian languages. Sun TV Network brought the rights of the show for Telugu, Tamil, Malayalam and Kannada-language versions. In 2022 Sony TV earned the rights for Master Chef India in Hindi.

History

Creation 
MasterChef India is a Hindi language adaption of the Australian show MasterChef Australia, which itself is based on the original British MasterChef. The first season of MasterChef India was aired on StarPlus and hosted by Akshay Kumar, Kunal Kapur and Ajay Chopra. It continued for six seasons and  Vikas Khanna, Sanjeev Kapoor, Chef Jolly,  Ranveer Brar, Zorawar Kalra, Vineet Bhatia and Garima Arora also participated as judges in different seasons of MasterChef India - Hindi

Expansion 
In early 2021, the show expanded into Tamil,  Telugu, Kannada and Malayalam through Sun TV Network. The south regional versions are telecasted by Sun TV, Gemini TV, Udaya TV and Surya TV. The first season of MasterChef India – Tamil was launched on 7 August 2021, while the first season of MasterChef India – Telugu was premiered on 27 August 2021. Vijay Sethupathi and Tamannaah are the hosts of Tamil and Telugu versions respectively. The Hindi version never had a host in any of its seasons. The upcoming Kannada and Malayalam versions are going to launch with Sudeep hosting the former. MasterChef India - Tamil was renewed for a second season in November 2021.

Versions 

  Currently airing – 1
  Upcoming for airing – 0
  Recently concluded – 2
  No longer airing – 1

 Female Winners
 Male Winners

References 

MasterChef India
Indian reality television series
Indian television series based on British television series
Endemol Shine Group franchises